Tire station is the main railway station in Tire,  Turkey and is the terminus of the  long Çatal-Tire railway. The station was built in 1883 by the Ottoman Railway Company and taken over by the Turkish State Railways in 1935.  The state railways operates four daily trains to Izmir in both directions.

Bus connections
ESHOT
 798 Tire-Torbalı

References

Railway stations in İzmir Province
Railway stations opened in 1883
1883 establishments in the Ottoman Empire
Tire District